Saturday Night at the Garden was an American sports series broadcast by the DuMont Television Network from October 7, 1950, to March 31, 1951. The program aired sports, primarily basketball, horse show, rodeo, and boxing live from Madison Square Garden in New York City. The program aired Saturday nights at 9pm ET and was 120 to 150 minutes long. The series was hosted by sportscaster Curt Gowdy and long time boxing blow-by-blow announcer Don Dunphy .

Episode status
As with most DuMont series, no episodes are known to exist. Some episodes may exist under the title Boxing With Dennis James at the UCLA Film and Television Archive.

See also
List of programs broadcast by the DuMont Television Network
List of surviving DuMont Television Network broadcasts
1950-51 United States network television schedule
Boxing From Jamaica Arena (September 1948 – 1949)
Amateur Boxing Fight Club (September 1949 – 1950)
Boxing From Sunnyside Gardens (September 1949 – 1950)
Wrestling From Marigold (September 1949 – 1955)
Boxing From Eastern Parkway (May 1952-May 1954)
Boxing From St. Nicholas Arena (1954-1956)

References

Bibliography
David Weinstein, The Forgotten Network: DuMont and the Birth of American Television (Philadelphia: Temple University Press, 2004) 
Alex McNeil, Total Television, Fourth edition (New York: Penguin Books, 1980) 
Tim Brooks and Earle Marsh, The Complete Directory to Prime Time Network TV Shows, Third edition (New York: Ballantine Books, 1964)

External links
 
DuMont historical website

DuMont Television Network original programming
1950 American television series debuts
1951 American television series endings
Black-and-white American television shows
American sports television series
English-language television shows
Lost television shows
Boxing television series
DuMont sports programming